Adriana Rodríguez Vizcarra Velázquez (born 22 December 1949) is a Mexican politician affiliated with the National Action Party. As of 2014 she served as Deputy of the LX Legislature of the Mexican Congress representing Guanajuato.

References

1949 births
Living people
Politicians from Mexico City
Women members of the Chamber of Deputies (Mexico)
National Action Party (Mexico) politicians
21st-century Mexican politicians
21st-century Mexican women politicians
Deputies of the LX Legislature of Mexico
Members of the Chamber of Deputies (Mexico) for Guanajuato